Manuel Orantes was the defending champion, but did not participate this year.

Rolf Gehring won the title, defeating Christophe Freyss 6–2, 0–6, 6–2, 6–2 in the final.

Seeds

  Víctor Pecci (second round)
  Wojtek Fibak (first round)
  Markus Günthardt (second round)
  Terry Moor (quarterfinals)
  Tom Okker (first round)
  Rolf Gehring (champion)
  Thomaz Koch (first round)
  Chris Lewis (second round)

Draw

Final

Section 1

Section 2

External links
 1980 Bavarian Tennis Championships Singles draw

Singles